The Venice–Trieste railway is a railway line in Italy.

History 
The section between Venice and San Giorgio di Nogaro was opened as a local railway from the private company Società Veneta in several sections between 1885 and 1888. Later it was decided to prolonge this line through the international border to Austria-Hungary; in 1894 the Austrian section between Cervignano and Monfalcone was opened by the Friauler Eisenbahn-Gesellschaft, the border section between San Giorgio and Cervignano followed three years later.

After the First World War all the line came to Italy, and it became a principal railway, managed by the state company Ferrovie dello Stato.

See also 
 List of railway lines in Italy

References

Bibliography 
 RFI - Fascicolo Linea 52 (Venezia Santa Lucia–Latisana)
 RFI - Fascicolo Linea 63 (Latisana–Trieste Centrale)

External links 

Railway lines in Friuli-Venezia Giulia
Railway lines in Veneto
Railway lines opened in 1897